Nithya may refer to

 Nithya Das, Indian film actress
 Nithya Mammen, Indian playback singer
 Nithya Menen (born 1988), Indian film actress
 Nithya Ram (born 1990), Indian television and film actress
 Nithya Raman, Indian-born American urban planner and politician
 Nithya Ravindran, Indian film actress
 Nithya Shree, Indian-Malaysian actress and makeup artist
 Yeto Vellipoyindhi Manasu (working title Nithya), a 2012 Indian Telugu-language film

See also
 Nitya